Oshtormel or Oshtormal or Oshtor Mol may refer to:
 Oshtormel, Hamadan
 Oshtormel, Kurdistan